Australia Ensemble UNSW is an Australian chamber group active since 1980.

The group was founded in 1980 as the University of New South Wales Ensemble after a proposal put to the University of New South Wales by musicologist Roger Covell and clarinettist Murray Khouri, then colleagues at the University. Its current Artistic Chair is Paul Stanhope who took over from Covell in 2014. In October 1983 the University of New South Wales Ensemble was renamed the Australia Ensemble, Resident at the University of New South Wales.

Since that time it has occupied a prominent position in Australian music, frequently touring in addition to a Sydney-based concert series. International performances have taken the ensemble to the USA, the UK, the then Soviet Union, Germany, France, Switzerland, Austria, the Netherlands, Poland, New Zealand, Hong Kong, Japan, China, India, South America, South Korea, Vietnam and Thailand. The Ensemble collaborates with major Australian and international performers, and frequently performs new works by Australian composers.

Membership

Current members
1980– Irina Morozova, viola
1982– Dene Olding, violin
1983– Geoffrey Collins, flute
1991– Julian Smiles, cello
1992– Dimity Hall, violin
2000– Ian Munro, piano
2018– David Griffiths, clarinet

Past members
1980–1985 Murray Khouri, clarinet
1980–1981 John Harding, violin
1980–1990 David Pereira, cello
1980–1998 David Bollard, piano
1980–1982 David Stanhope, horn and piano
1986 Donald Westlake, guest clarinet
1987–1991 Nigel Westlake clarinet
1992–1994 Alan Vivian, clarinet
1995–2014 Catherine McCorkill, clarinet
2015–2017 David Griffiths, associate artist

Awards and nominations

ARIA Music Awards
The ARIA Music Awards is an annual awards ceremony that recognises excellence, innovation, and achievement across all genres of Australian music. They commenced in 1987. 

! 
|-
| 1992
| Cafe Concertino
|rowspan="2" | Best Classical Album
| 
|rowspan="2" | 
|-
| 1996
| Shostakovich
| 
|-

References

External links
 
 
 Australia Ensemble UNSW on Facebook

APRA Award winners
ARIA Award winners
Australian orchestras
Contemporary classical music ensembles
Culture of Sydney
Musical groups established in 1980
1980 establishments in Australia